General William Ashe-à Court (c. 1708 – 2 August 1781) was a senior British Army officer and a Member of Parliament.

Born William à Court, he was the son of Pierce à Court, MP and Elizabeth Ashe of Ivy Church, Wiltshire. His older brother, Pierce A'Court-Ashe, was also an MP.

He joined the British Army as an ensign in the 11th Foot in 1726. He became a cornet in the 4th Dragoons in 1729 and in 1738 a lieutenant and captain in the 2nd Foot Guards, in which regiment he was subsequently promoted captain and lieutenant-colonel in 1745, 2nd major and colonel in 1755, major-general in 1759 and lieutenant-general in 1765. He served in Flanders during the War of the Austrian Succession (1740–48).

He was given the colonelcy of the 11th Foot in 1765, a position he held until his death. He was made full general on 19 March 1778.

He also sat as Member of Parliament for Heytesbury between 1751 and 1781. In 1768 he assumed by Royal licence the additional surname of Ashe in compliance with the will of his uncle, Edward Ashe.

He died in 1781. He had married Annabella Vernon, daughter of Thomas Vernon, in 1746. Their only son William succeeded him as MP for Heytesbury and was created a baronet in 1795. His grandson, also named William, was raised to the peerage as Baron Heytesbury in 1828.

Notes

References
Kidd, Charles, Williamson, David (editors). Debrett's Peerage and Baronetage (1990 edition). New York: St Martin's Press, 1990, 

1700s births
1781 deaths
Devonshire Regiment officers
Members of the Parliament of Great Britain for English constituencies
British MPs 1747–1754
British MPs 1754–1761
British MPs 1761–1768
British MPs 1768–1774
British MPs 1774–1780
British MPs 1780–1784
British Army generals
British Army personnel of the War of the Austrian Succession
Coldstream Guards officers